Judson Pratt (December 6, 1916 – February 9, 2002) was an American film, television and theatre actor. He was known for playing Billy Kinkaid in the American western television series Union Pacific.

Early life
Pratt was born in Hingham, Massachusetts. He made his theatre debut in 1941, playing a Western Union messenger in the Broadway play Popsy. Pratt made his screen debut in Armstrong Circle Theatre.

Career
Pratt guest-starred in numerous television programs including Barney Miller, Gunsmoke, Bonanza, Alfred Hitchcock Presents, Father Knows Best, Thriller, Perry Mason, Death Valley Days, The Streets of San Francisco, Rawhide, Mayberry, R.F.D., Nanny and the Professor, Mission: Impossible, The Guns of Will Sonnett, The Partridge Family, Bewitched and Charlie's Angels. He also appeared in films such as The Horse Soldiers, The Toy Tiger, Outside the Law, I Confess, Four Girls in Town, The Great American Pastime, Man Afraid, Vigilante Force, Somebody Up There Likes Me, Cheyenne Autumn, A Distant Trumpet, The Ugly American and The Barefoot Executive. Pratt retired in 1980, last appearing in the television soap opera Days of Our Lives.

Death
Pratt died in February 2002 in Northridge, California, at the age of 85. His body was cremated.

References

External links 

Rotten Tomatoes profile

1916 births
2002 deaths
People from Hingham, Massachusetts
Actors from Massachusetts
Male actors from Massachusetts
American male film actors
American male stage actors
American male television actors
American theatre people
20th-century American male actors
Western (genre) television actors
Male Western (genre) film actors